Light heavyweight, also referred to as junior cruiserweight or light cruiserweight, is a weight class in combat sports.

Boxing

Professional

The light-heavyweight class has produced some of boxing's greatest champions: Bernard Hopkins (who, upon becoming champion, broke the record for oldest man to win a world title), Archie Moore was the first oldest man to become champion Tommy Loughran, Billy Conn, Joey Maxim, Archie Moore, Michael Moorer, Bob Foster, Ann Wolfe, Michael Spinks, Dariusz Michalczewski, Roy Jones Jr., Sergey Kovalev and Zsolt Erdei.

Many light heavyweight champions unsuccessfully challenged for the heavyweight crown until Michael Spinks became the first reigning light heavyweight champion to win the heavyweight championship. Bob Fitzsimmons captured the light-heavyweight championship after losing his heavyweight championship. Two all-time great heavyweight champions, Ezzard Charles and Floyd Patterson, started out as light heavyweights. Charles defeated Archie Moore and Joey Maxim several times in non-title bouts before becoming heavyweight champion and Patterson lost an eight-round decision to Joey Maxim before becoming heavyweight champion himself. Evander Holyfield successfully moved up from the light-heavyweight division to the cruiserweight division and eventually the heavyweight division and became undisputed champion of the latter two.

Current world champions

Current world rankings

The Ring
As of January 28, 2023.

Keys:
 Current The Ring world champion

BoxRec
.

Longest reigning world light heavyweight champions
Below is a list of longest reigning light heavyweight champions in boxing measured by the individual's longest reign. Career total time as champion (for multiple time champions) does not apply.

 Active Title Reign
 Reign has ended

Amateur

Olympic champions

1920 – 
1924 – 
1928 – 
1932 – 
1936 – 
1948 – 
1952 – 
1956 – 
1960 – 
1964 – 
1968 –  
1972 – 
1976 – 
1980 – 
1984 – 
1988 – 
1992 – 
1996 – 
2000 – 
2004 – 
2008 – 
2012 – 
2016 – 
2020 –

Kickboxing
 In kickboxing, a light heavyweight fighter generally weighs between 77 kg (171 lb) and 82 kg (180 lb).
 In International Kickboxing Federation (IKF), a light heavyweight division is 172.1 – 179 lb (78.3 – 81.4 kg).
 In Glory promotion, a light heavyweight division is up to 95 kg (209 lb).
 In Bellator Kickboxing promotion, a light heavyweight division is up to 95 kg (209 lb).

Bare-knuckle boxing
The limit of light heavyweight generally differs among promotions in bare-knuckle boxing: 

Mixed martial arts

In MMA, the light heavyweight division is from 186 lb (84 kg) to 205 lb (93 kg).

References

Boxing weight classes
Kickboxing weight classes
Professional wrestling weight classes